Below is a sortable list of countries by number of Internet users as of 2020. Internet users are defined as persons who accessed the Internet in the last 12 months from any device, including mobile phones. Percentage is the percentage of a country's population that are Internet users. Estimates are derived either from household surveys or from Internet subscription data.

All United Nations member states are included, except North Korea, whose number of internet users is estimated at a few thousand.

Data from Statista and Internet World Stats estimates the total number of internet users in 2021 is between 4.3 billion to 5 billion active users.

Table

See also
 Global digital divide
 National broadband plan
 Loon LLC, a Google research and development project to provide Internet access to rural and remote areas
 List of social networking services
 List of countries by Internet connection speeds
 List of countries by number of broadband Internet subscriptions
 List of countries by number of telephone lines in use
 List of countries by smartphone penetration
 List of mobile network operators
 List of multiple-system operators
 List of telephone operating companies

Notes

References

External links
 "Internet Monitor", a research project of the Berkman Center for Internet & Society at Harvard University to evaluate, describe, and summarize the means, mechanisms, and extent of Internet access, content controls and activity around the world.
 Number Of Internet Users Worldwide (Live-Counter)
 "Dominican Republic Internet Users". www.internetlivestats.com. Retrieved 2016-10-28.
 "How Many Websites in the World"
Live data on the Internet is the data or information that you have access to.

International telecommunications
Internet users
Internet-related lists